Kahangarh is a village and panchayat in Mansa district, Punjab, India. it is situated on Delhi-Ferozepur railway line.

Villages in Mansa district, India